Gun metal, also known as red brass in the United States, is a type of bronze; an alloy of copper, tin and zinc. Proportions vary but 88% copper, 8–10% tin, and 2–4% zinc is an approximation. Originally used chiefly for making guns, it has largely been replaced by steel for that purpose. Gunmetal, which casts and machines well and is resistant to corrosion from steam and salt water, is used to make steam and hydraulic castings, valves, gears, statues and various small objects, such as buttons.

Variants
Gunmetal ingot is a related alloy in which the zinc is replaced by 2% lead; this makes the alloy easier to cast but it has less strength.
Modified gunmetal contains lead in addition to the zinc; it is typically composed of 86% copper, 9.5% tin, 2.5% lead, and 2% zinc. It is used for gears and bearings.
U.S. government bronze specification G C90500 is composed of 88% copper, 10% tin, and 2% zinc, as is British Admiralty gunmetal.
G bronze (or Copper Alloy No. C90300) contains 88% copper, 8% tin, and 4% zinc.
U.S. government bronze specification H is composed of 83% copper, 14% tin, 3% zinc, and 0.8% phosphorus.
Red brass is used to produce pipes, valves, and plumbing fixtures and is considered to offer a good mixture of corrosion resistance, strength and ease of casting. It typically contains 85% copper, 5% tin, 5% lead, and 5% zinc.
Copper Alloy C23000, which is  known as red brass, contains 84–86% copper, 0.05% each iron and lead, with the balance being zinc.

Gunmetal can also mean steel treated to simulate gunmetal bronze. Bushings made of this metal are used in machinery.

Other uses of gun metal
Gun money, Irish late 17th-century emergency coins, contain gunmetal, as worn and scrapped guns were used to make them; but also many other metals, in particular brass and bronze, as people donated pots and pans and other metal objects.

External doors and windows of offshore rock lighthouses are often made of gunmetal due to its corrosion resistant properties.

References

Bronze
Plumbing